Râmnicu Sărat Prison is a former prison located in Râmnicu Sărat, Buzău County, Romania. The building is listed as a historic monument by Romania's Ministry of Culture and Religious Affairs.

Before World War II
The prison was built at the end of the 19th century, and first attested in a document of October 1901. From its establishment until 1938, it housed common criminals with sentences of up to two years. After the onset of King Carol II's royal dictatorship in 1938, the prison began to be used for political prisoners, namely the leadership of the Iron Guard, including Corneliu Zelea Codreanu.

During the communist period
From 1955 to 1963, a significant number of prominent political prisoners were held there by the communist regime. Alexandru Vișinescu was the commander of the prison from 1956 to 1963. In 2015 he was convicted of crimes against humanity for his treatment of detainees, and sentenced to 20 years' imprisonment.

Unlike the much larger prisons at Gherla, Aiud, and Jilava, the Râmnicu Sărat penitentiary was rather small, with a maximum capacity of 300 inmates, provided there were 4 of them per cell.

Notable inmates
This is a partial list of notable inmates of Sărat Prison; the symbol † indicates those who died there.

Notes

External links

Socialist Republic of Romania
Buildings and structures in Buzău County
Defunct prisons in Romania
Historic monuments in Buzău County
1901 establishments in Romania
1963 disestablishments in Romania
Râmnicu Sărat
Political repression in Romania